The Bradford County School District manages public education in Bradford County, Florida. Its main office is in Starke, Florida. Schools in the district include:
 Bradford High School (Florida)
 Bradford Middle School
 Starke Elementary School
 Southside Elementary School
 Brooker Elementary School
 Hampton Elementary School
 Lawtey Elementary School

External links

Education in Bradford County, Florida
Bradford County